Real Titánico de Laviana is a Spanish football team based in Laviana, in the autonomous community of Asturias. Founded in 1912 and refounded in 1964, the team plays in Tercera División RFEF – Group 2. The club's home ground is Estadio Les Tolves, which has a capacity of 2,000 spectators.

History 
The club was created in 1912 as Titanic de Laviana. King Alfonso XIII accepted the Royal patronage of the club for the Spanish crown in 1922, introducing the term "Real" (Spanish for "Royal") to its name, becoming Real Titanic de Laviana.

After the Spanish Civil War, and due to a temporary law forbidding the use of foreign words in football club names, the team's official denomination changed to Real Titánico. The club was dissolved in 1960 but it was refounded in 1964 with the name of Laviana CF. In the 70's the team recovered the name of Real Titánico.

The best seasons of Titánico happened during the 1990s and the start of the 2000s, when the club played four times the promotion play-offs to Segunda División B and won one time the Asturian group of Tercera División. In 2006 the club started its decline with two consecutive relegations.

On 31 April 2017, after ten seasons in Primera Regional, sixth tier, Titánico came back to Regional Preferente. Three years later, Titánico promoted to Tercera División. This promotion was achieved as the club was leader of the Regional Preferente, with an advantage of 16 points over the second qualified team with ten rounds to be played, before the suspension of the league due to the COVID-19 pandemic.

Season to season

34 seasons in Tercera División
1 season in Tercera División RFEF

Notable managers
 Josu Uribe

References

External links
BDFutbol profile
futbolenasturias.com profile 

Football clubs in Asturias
Association football clubs established in 1912
1912 establishments in Spain
Divisiones Regionales de Fútbol clubs
T